Zibalai is a town in Širvintos district municipality, Vilnius County, east Lithuania. According to the Lithuanian census of 2011, the town has a population of 129 people. The town has a church of Catholics.

References

Towns in Vilnius County
Towns in Lithuania